Athenian Motorsports was an American professional stock car racing team that last competed in the NASCAR Xfinity Series, the Camping World Truck Series, and the ARCA Racing Series. In the Xfinity Series, the team last fielded the No. 05 Zaxby's Chevrolet Camaro part-time for John Wes Townley. In the Camping World Truck Series, the team last fielded the No. 05 Zaxby's Chevrolet Silverado full-time for part-time drivers: John Wes Townley, Parker Kligerman, Brady Boswell, Cody Coughlin, and Matt DiBenedetto. In the ARCA Racing Series, the team last fielded the No. 05 Zaxby's Chevrolet Impala part-time for Townley. The team was sponsored by Zaxby's Chicken Restaurants, co-founded by John Wes' father and team owner Tony Townley, and the team name is likely a reference to the company's home in Athens, Georgia. The team closed down in 2017, and sold its owner points to MDM Motorsports' No. 99 team.

History
The team debuted in May 2014 in the Nationwide Series (now Xfinity Series) running a partial schedule. In July 2014, the team expanded their operation into the Camping World Truck Series. In September, it was announced that veteran crew chief Mike Ford would join the team as the crew chief for the No. 25 Nationwide Series team, while Mike Beam would stay on as the crew chief of the No. 05 truck. The team also purchased the race shop of Richard Petty Motorsports owned by Boris Said near the Concord Regional Airport.

In November 2014 the team announced it would switch to Chevrolet and run full-time in both the Xfinity Series and Truck Series, with engines supplied by Hendrick Motorsports, and equipment purchased from Kyle Busch Motorsports and the defunct Turner Scott Motorsports (a former Hendrick-affiliated team). Townley would pilot the Truck Series entry full-time and run the majority of the Xfinity Series races.

Xfinity Series

Car No. 25 history

The team debuted in the Nationwide Series with John Wes Townley at Talladega in May 2014, finishing 13th. They ran car No. 25, which Townley had run the previous year with Venturini Motorsports part-time. The team announced on May 7 that it would compete in 12 additional Nationwide races in 2014, while Townley would continue to run the full season in Trucks with Wauters Motorsports and the ARCA Racing Series with Venturini. Beginning at the Nationwide Series race at Chicagoland in July and continuing at Indianapolis in July and Bristol in August, Athenian Motorsports announced a three-race sponsorship with the movie The Identical, running on the hood of the Zaxby's Toyota Camry.

In an August 2014 conversation with Motorsport.com, John Wes Townley said that Athenian Motorsports was preparing to run the full 2015 season in the Xfinity Series. The team expanded full-time for 2015, with Townley running 24 Xfinity races. The remaining races were to be filled by a driver with sponsorship. In February, it was announced that K&N Pro Series West driver and NASCAR Next member Dylan Lupton was hired to run a minimum of seven races in the No. 25 starting at Phoenix International Raceway, with continued sponsorship from Zaxby's. Lupton qualified 23rd and finished 19th in his debut at Phoenix. Alex Bowman drove two races at Michigan and Indianapolis due to drivers busy competing in their Series. The team withdrew from the October race at Dover, operating on a race-by-race basis for the remainder of the season.

The team returned in 2016 only running in the restrictor plate races. With Rick Ware Racing receiving the No. 25, the team changed to the No. 05, used in its other operations.

Camping World Truck Series

Truck No. 05 history

Initially, Athenian Motorsports was to have begun their Camping World Truck Series efforts in 2015 with John Wes Townley. After eight 2014 starts and two top five finishes in the Truck Series however, in July Townley left Wauters Motorsports' No. 5 Tundra, moving to the No. 05 Tundra owned by his father starting at Iowa. After Townley suffered a concussion at Pocono during an ARCA race, Clint Bowyer drove the No. 05 Zaxby's truck for Athenian in the Truck Series race that weekend. Bowyer, who had previously been sponsored by Zaxby's in 2010, finished fourth in the race. 2003 Truck Champion Travis Kvapil replaced Townley at Michigan. Kvapil qualified well and ran up front early, but blew the engine on lap 8. Townley returned at Bristol in August, running an all black 05 Zaxby's Tundra. Townley had a top 15 truck, but wrecked racing young NTS drivers Gray Gaulding and Brennan Newberry.

Townley returned to the No. 05 truck for 2015, with the team switching to Chevrolet. Former Truck Series winner Terry Cook would serve as the team's spotter. Townley would score his first career victory on October 3 at Las Vegas Motor Speedway, taking the lead with six laps to go and winning on a fuel mileage gamble. Townley finished eighth in the championship standings.

Townley returned full-time for 2016, though Parker Kligerman drove at Kentucky Speedway due to Townley undergoing treatment for a possible concussion. Next week, 19 year-old Brady Boswell took over the No. 05 ride with Townley still injured at Eldora.

ARCA Racing Series

Car No. 05 history
In 2016, the team ran the No. 05 Zaxby's Chevrolet full-time in the ARCA Racing Series, with John Wes Townley running the majority of the season. The team won its ARCA debut at Daytona with JWT.

See also
 Zaxby's
 Wauters Motorsports
 Venturini Motorsports

References

External links
 
 

Defunct NASCAR teams